Pavel Nikolaevich Vlasov (born 13 October 1960) is a Russian test pilot, engineer, one of the Gromov Flight Research Institute directors (2010–2017), chief of the Gagarin Cosmonaut Training Centre (2017–2021) and Hero of the Russian Federation.

Biography

Early years and military service 
Vlasov was born on October 13, 1960, in the city of Lebedyn in the Ukrainian SSR (current Ukraine). He graduated high school with a gold medal and in 1977 he entered the Gritsevets Military Aviation Higher School of Pilots. 

He trained there with Aero L-39 and MIG-21 aircraft and graduated with a "red diploma" in 1981.

Upon graduation Vlasov was assigned to serve as a flight instructor and trained military pilots in the same flight school. In 1987 he was selected for test pilot training at the Fedotov Test Pilot School.

Aerospace industry 
Upon graduation from the Fedotov Test Pilot School in 1989 Vlasov worked for the MiG Corporation as a test pilot and as a deputy director general for flight testing (2002–2010). 
He participated in flight testing of MiG-31 heavy interceptor, accomplished maiden flights and flight testing of the carrier-based MiG-29K fighter and thrust-vectoring version of MiG-29 (MiG-29OVT), MiG-29M/M2 and MiG-35 fighters and the MiG-AT trainer. Vlasov is type rated for 35 types of aircraft.

As an aerobatics pilot he flew demonstration flights at international air shows in the UK, Germany, India, the United Arab Emirates, Poland, France and Slovakia, and was awarded several times for his skills.

He headed the Gromov Flight Research Institute from January 2010, while keeping his position in the MiG Corporation until February 2014. In 2010, he completed the United Aircraft Corporation strategic personnel reserve programme in the Moscow School of Management SKOLKOVO. Vlasov worked as head of the Gromov Institute during its transformation into a public company, and became its Director General in 2012.

In November 2017 he became the head of the Gagarin Cosmonaut Training Centre where worked until 1 June 2021.

Family 
In 1986, Vlasov married Elena Pavlovna Vlasova, a teacher of chemistry and biology. Together they have a daughter Anna (born 1987) and a son Andrey (born 1993).

Awards and decorations 
 Hero of the Russian Federation (1998)
 Order of Courage (1996)
 Merited Test Pilot of the Russian Federation (2003)
 Honoured Aircraft Engineer of the Russian Federation
 Golden Idea National Award (2004)
 Golden Chariot Transport Award (2007)

References

External links 
 

1960 births
Russian aerospace engineers
Soviet aviators
People in aviation
Aerobatic pilots
Russian aviators
Living people
Soviet Air Force officers
Soviet test pilots
Fedotov TPS alumni
Golden Idea national award winners
Gromov Flight Research Institute employees
Heroes of the Russian Federation